David Burnet or Burnett may refer to:

David G. Burnet (1788–1870), president of the interim government of the Republic of Texas during 1836
David Burnet (Quebec politician) (c. 1803–1853), businessman and Quebec politician
David Burnett (photojournalist) (born 1946), American photojournalist
David Burnett (politician) (born 1942/3), Arkansas politician and former judge
David Burnett, co-host of the Food Network Canada TV program Man-Made Food
David Burnett, roofing company owner and candidate for the U.S. House of Representatives in North Carolina in 2010
Sir David Burnett, 1st Baronet (1851–1930) of the Burnett baronets
Sir David Humphrey Burnett, 3rd Baronet (1918–2002) of the Burnett baronets

See also
Burnett (surname)